Darla is a female given name of English origin which is a variant of Darlene.

Darla may refer to:

People 
 Darla K. Anderson, American film producer
 Darla Hood (1931–1979), American child actress, best known for her role in the Our Gang series
 Darla Moore (born 1954), American businesswoman
 Darla Pacheco (born 1989), Puerto Rican model
 Darla Vandenbossche (born 1963), Canadian actress

Fictional characters
 Darla (Buffy the Vampire Slayer), a vampire in Buffy the Vampire Slayer
 Darla (Finding Nemo), character in the animated film Finding Nemo
 Darla Aquista, aka the Warlock's Daughter, a DC Comics character
 Darla Dudley, a DC Comics character from Shazam! comics and a member of the Shazam Family
 Darla Forrester, in The Bold and the Beautiful
 Darla Dimple, the female main antagonist of the 1997 animated musical comedy film Cats Don't Dance

Other 
 Darla (dog), animal actor who played "Precious" in Silence of the Lambs

English feminine given names
English-language feminine given names